Ķintu well is a historical object in Cīrava parish, Latvia. It is made of large carved stone blocks up to 2 meters long. The cross-section of the well forms a square with 1.25 m long sides. The Ķintu well is an archaeological monument, possibly the remains of an earlier larger megalithic complex.

References 

History of Latvia